The All Aged Stakes is an Australian Turf Club Group 1 Thoroughbred Weight for Age horse race, run over a distance of 1,400 metres at Randwick Racecourse, Sydney, Australia in April or May during the ATC Autumn Carnival. Prize money is A$600,000.

History

The race has a long history and presence in the AJC Autumn Meeting dating back to 1865.
The race was open to any aged thoroughbred including 2 year olds. In 1885 the 2-year-old filly Astrœa was victorious.

The race attracted champions from every era that included Carbine, Wakeful, triple winner of the race Ajax, Tulloch and Tobin Bronze. In the modern era Rough Habit and Sunline won the race twice.

Prizemoney was increased in 2016 from $400,000 to $600,000.

Distance
 1865–1972 - 1 mile
 1973–2003 – 1600 metres
 2004 onwards - 1400 metres

1942 racebook

Gallery of noted winners

Winners

 2022 - Cascadian
 2021 - Kolding
 2020 - Tofane
 2019 - Pierata
 2018 - Trapeze Artist
 2017 - Tivaci
 2016 - English
 2015 - Dissident
 2014 - Hana's Goal
 2013 - All Too Hard
 2012 - Atlantic Jewel
 2011 - Hay List
 2010 - Hot Danish
 2009 - Danleigh
 2008 - Racing To Win
 2007 - Bentley Biscuit
 2006 - Paratroopers
 2005 - Shamekha
 2004 - Private Steer
 2003 - Arlington Road
 2002 - Sunline
 2001 - El Mirada
 2000 - Sunline
 1999 - Intergaze
 1998 - Des's Dream
 1997 - All Our Mob
 1996 - Flying Spur
 1995 - Hurricane Sky
 1994 - Prince Of Praise
 1993 - Rough Habit
 1992 - Rough Habit
 1991 - Shaftesbury Avenue
 1990 - Eastern Classic
 1989 - Card Shark
 1988 - Sound Horizon
 1987 - Campaign King
 1986 - Drawn
 1985 - Vite Cheval
 1984 - Emancipation
 1983 - Rare Form
 1982 - My Gold Hope
 1981 - Watney
 1980 - Bit Of A Skite
 1979 - Belmura Lad
 1978 - Always Welcome
 1977 - Dalrello
 1976 - Dalrello
 1975 - Gilt Patten
 1974 - Tontonan
 1973 - All Shot
 1972 - Triton
 1971 - Abdul
 1970 - Broker's Tip
 1969 - Foresight
 1968 - Unpainted
 1967 - Tobin Bronze
 1966 - Even Better
 1965 - Scottish Soldier
 1964 - Wenona Girl
 1963 - Kilshery
 1962 - Kilshery
 1961 - Sky High
 1960 - Noholme
 1959 - Lord
 1958 - Tulloch
 1957 - Kingster
 1956 - King's Fair
 1955 - Prince Morvi
 1954 - Prince Cortauld
 1953 - Red Jester
 1952 - San Domenico
 1951 - Achilles
 1950 - The Groom
 1949 - Phoibos
 1948 - Murray Stream
 1947 - Victory Lad
 1946 - Bernborough
 1945 - Cold Shower
 1944 - Katanga
 1943 - Yaralla
 1942 - Yaralla 
 1941 - Gold Salute
 1940 - Ajax
 1939 - Ajax
 1938 - Ajax
 1937 - Regular Bachelor
 1936 - Cuddle
 1935 - Peter Pan
 1934 - Chatham
 1933 - Winooka
 1932 - Viol D'amour
 1931 - Sir Chrystopher
 1930 - Amounis
 1929 - Mollison
 1928 - Limerick
 1927 - Fujisan
 1926 - Valicare
 1925 - The Hawk
 1924 - Claro
 1923 - Purser
 1922 - Beauford
 1921 - Speciality
 1920 - Chrysolaus
 1919 - Greenstead
 1918 - Desert Gold
 1917 - Whitefield
 1916 - Woorak
 1915 - Spurn
 1914 - Cider
 1913 - Jolly Beggar
 1912 - Malt King
 1911 - Malt King
 1910 - Bobrikoff
 1909 - Montcalm
 1908 - Mountain King
 1907 - Lady Wallace
 1906 - Charles Stuart
 1905 - Gladsome
 1904 - Gladsome
 1903 - Emir
 1902 - Wakeful
 1901 - Advance
 1900 - Sequence
 1899 - Merloolas
 1898 - Bobadil
 1897 - Hopscotch
 1896 - Tire
 1895 - Georgic
 1894 - Marvel
 1893 - Cremorne
 1892 - Bungebah
 1891 - Marvel
 1890 - Carbine
 1889 - Carbine
 1888 - Lady Betty
 1887 - Matador
 1886 - Cerise And Blue
 1885 - Astrœa
 1884 - Brown And Rose
 1883 - Archie
 1882 - Wheatear
 1881 - Etna
 1880 - Faublas
 1879 - Avernus
 1878 - Bosworth
 1877 - Tocal
 1876 - Briseis
 1875 - Lurline
 1874 - Fitz-Yattendon
 1873 - The Ace
 1872 - Hamlet
 1871 - Tim Whiffler
 1870 - Tim Whiffler
 1869 - Glencoe
 1868 - Fireworks
 1867 - Yattendon
 1866 - †Falcon
       1865    -       Maid of the Lake

†The Pitsford was first past the post but was disqualified.

See also
 List of Australian Group races
 Group races

References

External links
 First three placegetters All Aged Stakes (ATC)

Open mile category horse races
Group 1 stakes races in Australia
Randwick Racecourse
Recurring sporting events established in 1865
Horse racing